Carl Gustafsson may refer to:

 Carl Gustafsson (hockey) (born 1989), Swedish hockey player
 Carl Gustafsson (footballer) (born 2000), Swedish footballer

See also
 Charlie Gustafsson (born 1992), Swedish actor